Foreign & Colonial Investment Trust is a publicly traded investment trust. It is listed on the London Stock Exchange and is a constituent of the FTSE 100 Index; it is also listed on the New Zealand Exchange.

History
The company was founded by Philip Rose, who also founded the Royal Brompton Hospital, in 1868 as The Foreign & Colonial Government Trust: it was the first collective investment scheme in the world and specialised in investing in Government bonds. In 1891 it changed its name to The Foreign & Colonial Investment Trust: it first started investing in equities in 1925. In 1981, F&C launched Graphite Capital, a leading UK private equity firm.

Operations
The company has assets under management of approximately £3.7 billion and holds stakes in over 500 different companies in 35 countries worldwide. The company is managed by Paul Niven of F&C Asset Management.

References

Further reading
F&C: A History of Foreign & Colonial Investment Trust by Neil McKendrick and John Newlands, 1999.

External links
Official website

Investment trusts of the United Kingdom
Financial services companies established in 1868
British companies established in 1868
1868 establishments in England
Companies listed on the London Stock Exchange
Companies listed on the New Zealand Exchange
Dual-listed companies